Kent is a county in the south-eastern corner of England. It is bounded to the north by Greater London and the Thames Estuary, to the west by Sussex and Surrey, and to the south and east by the English channel and the North Sea. The county town is Maidstone. It is governed by Kent County Council, with twelve district councils, Ashford, Canterbury, Dartford, Dover, Folkestone and Hythe, Gravesham, Maidstone, Thanet, Tonbridge and Malling and Tunbridge Wells. Medway is a separate unitary authority. The chalk hills of the North Downs run from east to west through the county, with the wooded Weald to the south. The coastline is alternately flat and cliff-lined. 
 
In England, Sites of Special Scientific Interest (SSSIs) are designated by Natural England, which is responsible for protecting England's natural environment. Designation as an SSSI gives legal protection to the most important wildlife and geological sites. As of May 2018, there are 98 sites designated in Kent. There are 21 sites which have been designated for their geological interest, 67 for their biological interest, and 10 for both reasons.

Sixteen sites are Special Areas of Conservation, eight are Special Protection Areas, twenty-three are Nature Conservation Review sites, thirty-three are Geological Conservation Review sites, eleven are national nature reserves, nine are Ramsar internationally important wetland sites, eleven are local nature reserves, thirteen are in Areas of Outstanding Natural Beauty, one is on the Register of Historic Parks and Gardens of Special Historic Interest in England and two contain scheduled monuments. Seventeen sites are managed by the Kent Wildlife Trust, four by the Royal Society for the Protection of Birds and seven by the National Trust.

Key

Interest
B = site of biological interest
G = site of geological interest

Public access
FP = access to footpaths through the site only
NO = no public access to site
PP = public access to part of site
YES = public access to all or most of the site

Other classifications
AONB = Area of Outstanding Natural Beauty
KWT = Kent Wildlife Trust
GCR = Geological Conservation Review site
LNR = Local nature reserve
NCR = Nature Conservation Review site
NNR = National nature reserve
NT = National Trust
Plant = Plantlife, a wild plant conservation charity
Ramsar = Ramsar site, an internationally important wetland site
RHPG = Register of Historic Parks and Gardens of Special Historic Interest in England
RSPB = Royal Society for the Protection of Birds
SAC = Special Area of Conservation
SM = Scheduled monument
SPA = Special Protection Area under the European Union Directive on the Conservation of Wild Birds

Sites

See also
List of Local Nature Reserves in Kent
Kent Wildlife Trust

Notes

References

Sources

 
Kent